List of Japanese movie studios:
Art Theatre Guild
Daiei Motion Picture Company
Kadokawa Pictures
Kindai Eiga Kyokai
Million Film
Nikkatsu Corporation
Shintoho
Shintōhō Eiga
Shochiku
Shochiku Studio
Taishō Katsuei
Tennenshoku Katsudō Shashin
Toei Company
Toho
Yokota Shōkai
Yoshizawa Shōten

 
Japanese film-related lists